The following lists events that happened in 1968 in Iceland.

Incumbents
President – Ásgeir Ásgeirsson, Kristján Eldjárn
Prime Minister – Bjarni Benediktsson

Events
Hægri dagurinn or H-dagurinn happened in May, when Iceland switched from left-hand traffic to right hand traffic

Births

12 March – Ólafur Gottskálksson, footballer
20 May – Ólafur Kristjánsson, footballer
29 May – Sigríður Ingibjörg Ingadóttir, economist and politician.
9 June – Gunnar Bragi Sveinsson, politician.
25 June – Sigursteinn Gíslason, footballer (d. 2012).
26 June – Guðni Th. Jóhannesson, historian
29 July – Brynhildur Davíðsdóttir, scientist

Deaths

18 June – Nína Tryggvadóttir, artist (b. 1913)
30 July – Jón Leifs, composer, pianist, and conductor (b. 1899)

Full date missing
Gunnfríður Jónsdóttir, sculptor (b. 1889)

References

 
1960s in Iceland
Iceland
Iceland
Years of the 20th century in Iceland